The 1971 New York Jets season was the twelfth season for the team and the second in the National Football League. It began with the team trying to improve upon its 4–10 record from 1970 under head coach Weeb Ewbank.

Disaster struck before the regular season started and the Jets finished 6–8. Joe Namath was injured in a preseason game against the Detroit Lions and required knee surgery, All-Pro WR George Sauer unexpectedly retired at the peak of his career, and All-Pro defensive end Verlon Biggs exercised his option and signed with the Washington Redskins.

After missing nineteen consecutive Jets games in 1970 and 1971, Namath returned to action against the San Francisco 49ers in the third quarter (November 28, 1971) and threw for 258 yards and three touchdowns, but was intercepted by Johnny Fuller in the end zone on the final play of a 24–21 loss. He then started the final three games, and the Jets won the last two after suffering a 52–10 loss in a nationally televised game to the eventual Super Bowl champion Dallas Cowboys.

Offseason

NFL Draft

Roster

Regular season

Schedule

Intra-division opponents are in bold text.

Standings

References

External links
1971 statistics

New York Jets seasons
New York Jets
New York Jets season
1970s in Queens